Ševčík (feminine Ševčíková) is a Czech and Slovak occupational surname, derived from the profession of Švec, "shoemaker". It is related to the Polish name Szewczyk. Notable people include:

 Adam Ševčík (born 1993), Czech footballer
 František Ševčík (1942–2017), Czech ice hockey player
 Ján Ševčík (1896–1965), Slovak politician
 Jaroslav Ševčík (born 1965), Czech ice hockey player
 John Sevcik (born 1942), American baseball player
 Joseph G. Sevcik (1916–1977), American lawyer and politician
 Julius Ševčík (born 1978), Czech director
 Michal Ševčík (born 2002), Czech footballer
 Otakar Ševčík (1852–1934), Czech violinist
 Petr Ševčík (born 1994), Czech footballer
 Petra Ševčíková (born 2000), Czech racing cyclist

See also
 
A namesake of the Randles–Sevcik equation
A plaintiff in Sevcik v. Sandoval, a U.S. lawsuit
Dan Shevchik, American competitive swimmer
Byron Shefchik, American competitive swimmer
Rick Shefchik, American journalist and author

Occupational surnames
Czech-language surnames
Slovak-language surnames